Powells or Powell's may refer to:

Places
 Powell Islands (Powells), Raa Atoll, Maldives

Cities, towns, communities
 Powells Corners, Ontario, Canada

United States
 Powells Crossroads, Tennessee
 Powells Point, North Carolina
 Powellton, California, formerly called Powell's Ranch

Watercourses, rivers, creeks
 Powell's Creek (Prince George County, Virginia), United States
 Powells Creek, a river in Prince William County, Virginia, United States
 Powells Creek (Sydney), Australia

Mathematics
 Powell's method, an algorithm for finding a local minimum of a function
 Powell's dog leg method, an iterative optimization

Other uses
 Powell's Books, a bookstore chain in Portland, Oregon, United States

See also

 
 
 Powell (disambiguation)